Barnesville Exempted Village Schools serves the village of Barnesville, Ohio, United States, and the surrounding area.

Board of education 
 Rob Miller, President
 Scott Baker, Vice President
 Matt King, Treasurer
 Dennis Huntsman
 Sam Lucas
 Kenny Triplett
 Angela Hannahs, Superintendent

Administration

Renovations 
In 2002, the village of Barnesville saw a rebirth of its schools. The high school, located on the eastern edge of Barnesville, was remodeled to expand classroom areas and improve appearances, as well as the addition of a new administrative wing. A new middle school was built beside the high school to rectify the crowded school downtown. The elementary school was remodeled and an older section of the building was removed. The renovations and new school left the school board in a weak financial state, it is now using fundraisers to increase its stability.

Athletics 
The school's sports teams' mascot is the shamrock.

See also 
 Barnesville High School (Barnesville, Ohio)
 East Central Ohio ESC

External links 
 

Education in Belmont County, Ohio
Barnesville, Ohio
School districts in Ohio